Functional integration is a collection of results in mathematics and physics where the domain of an integral is no longer a region of space, but a space of functions. Functional integrals arise in probability, in the study of partial differential equations, and in the path integral approach to the quantum mechanics of particles and fields.

In an ordinary integral (in the sense of Lebesgue integration) there is a function to be integrated (the integrand) and a region of space over which to integrate the function (the domain of integration). The process of integration consists of adding up the values of the integrand for each point of the domain of integration.  Making this procedure rigorous requires a limiting procedure, where the domain of integration is divided into smaller and smaller regions.  For each small region, the value of the integrand cannot vary much, so it may be replaced by a single value. In a functional integral the domain of integration is a space of functions.  For each function, the integrand returns a value to add up.  Making this procedure rigorous poses challenges that continue to be topics of current research.

Functional integration was developed by Percy John Daniell in an article of 1919 and Norbert Wiener in a series of studies culminating in his articles of 1921 on Brownian motion.  They developed a rigorous method (now known as the Wiener measure) for assigning a probability to a particle's random path.  Richard Feynman developed another functional integral, the path integral, useful for computing the quantum properties of systems.  In Feynman's path integral, the classical notion of a unique trajectory for a particle is replaced by an infinite sum of classical paths, each weighted differently according to its classical properties.

Functional integration is central to quantization techniques in theoretical physics.  The algebraic properties of functional integrals are used to develop series used to calculate properties in quantum electrodynamics and the standard model of particle physics.

Functional integration

Whereas standard Riemann integration sums a function f(x) over a continuous range of values of x, functional integration sums a functional G[f], which can be thought of as a "function of a function" over a continuous range (or space) of functions f. Most functional integrals cannot be evaluated exactly but must be evaluated using perturbation methods. The formal definition of a functional integral is

which is slightly more understandable. The integral is shown to be a functional integral with a capital D. Sometimes it is written in square brackets: [Df] or D[f], to indicate that f is a function.

Examples
Most functional integrals are actually infinite, but then the limit of the quotient of two related functional integrals can still be finite. The functional integrals that can be evaluated exactly usually start with the following Gaussian integral:

By functionally differentiating this with respect to J(x) and then setting  to 0 this becomes an exponential multiplied by a polynomial in f. For example, setting , we find:

where a, b and x are 4-dimensional vectors. This comes from the formula for the propagation of a photon in quantum electrodynamics. Another useful integral is the functional delta function:

which is useful to specify constraints. Functional integrals can also be done over Grassmann-valued functions , where , which is useful in quantum electrodynamics for calculations involving fermions.

Approaches to path integrals

Functional integrals where the space of integration consists of paths (ν = 1) can be defined in many different ways.  The definitions fall in two different classes: the constructions derived from Wiener's theory yield an integral based on a measure, whereas the constructions following Feynman's path integral do not.  Even within these two broad divisions, the integrals are not identical, that is, they are defined differently for different classes of functions.

The Wiener integral

In the Wiener integral, a probability is assigned to a class of Brownian motion paths.  The class consists of the paths w that are known to go through a small region of space at a given time.  The passage through different regions of space is assumed independent of each other, and the distance between any two points of the Brownian path is assumed to be Gaussian-distributed with a variance that depends on the time t and on a diffusion constant D:

The probability for the class of paths can be found by multiplying the probabilities of starting in one region and then being at the next.  The Wiener measure can be developed by considering the limit of many small regions.

 Itō and Stratonovich calculus

The Feynman integral

 Trotter formula, or Lie product formula.
 The Kac idea of Wick rotations.
 Using x-dot-dot-squared or i S[x] + x-dot-squared.
 The Cartier DeWitt–Morette relies on integrators rather than measures

The Lévy integral

 Fractional quantum mechanics
 Fractional Schrödinger equation
 Lévy process
 Fractional statistical mechanics

See also
Feynman path integral
Partition function (quantum field theory)
Saddle point approximation

References

Further reading
   Jean Zinn-Justin (2009), Scholarpedia 4(2):8674.
 Kleinert, Hagen, Path Integrals in Quantum Mechanics, Statistics, Polymer Physics, and Financial Markets, 4th edition, World Scientific (Singapore, 2004); Paperback    (also available online: PDF-files)

 O. G. Smolyanov, E. T. Shavgulidze. Continual integrals. Moscow, Moscow State University Press, 1990. (in Russian). http://lib.mexmat.ru/books/5132
Victor Popov, Functional Integrals in Quantum Field Theory and Statistical Physics, Springer 1983
Sergio Albeverio, Sonia Mazzucchi, A unified approach to infinite-dimensional integration, Reviews in Mathematical Physics, 28, 1650005 (2016)

Integral calculus
Functional analysis
Mathematical physics
Quantum mechanics
Quantum field theory